Baphia is a small genus of legumes that bear simple leaves. Baphia is from the Greek word βάπτω (báptō-, "to dip" or "to dye"), referring to a red dye that is extracted from the heartwood of tropical species. The genus is restricted to the African tropics. Baphia was traditionally assigned to the tribe Sophoreae; however, recent molecular phylogenetic analyses reassigned Baphia to the tribe Baphieae.

Species
Baphia comprises the following species:

Section Alata M.O.Soladoye
 Baphia cordifolia Harms

Section Baphia Lodd.

Series Baphia Lodd.
 Baphia abyssinica Brummitt

 Baphia dewevrei De Wild.
 Baphia dewildeana M.O.Soladoye

 Baphia latiloi M.O.Soladoye
 Baphia laurifolia Baillon
 Baphia longipedicellata De Wild.
 subsp. keniensis (Brummitt) M.O.Soladoye
 subsp. longipedicellata De Wild.
 Baphia mambillensis M.O.Soladoye
 Baphia marceliana De Wild.
 subsp. marceliana De Wild.
 subsp. marquesii (M.Exell) M.O.Soladoye

 Baphia nitida Lodd. (Camwood)

 Baphia pauloi Brummitt

 Baphia pubescens Hook.f.
 Baphia puguensis Brummitt
 Baphia punctulata Harms
 subsp. descampsii (De Wild.) M.O.Soladoye
 subsp. palmensis M.O.Soladoye
 subsp. punctulata Harms

Series Contiguinae M.O.Soladoye
 Baphia angolensis Baker

 Baphia brachybotrys Harms
 Baphia breteleriana M.O.Soladoye

 Baphia buettneri Harms
 subsp. buettneri Harms
 subsp. hylophila (Harms) M.O.Soladoye

 Baphia gossweileri Baker f.

 Baphia incerta De Wild.
 subsp. incerta De Wild.
 subsp. lebrunii (L.Touss.) M.O.Soladoye

 Baphia leptostemma Baillon
 subsp. gracilipes (Harms) M.O.Soladoye
 var. gracilipes (Harms) M.O.Soladoye
 var. conraui (Harms) M.O.Soladoye
 subsp. leptostemma Baillon

 Baphia preussii Harms
 Baphia obanensis Baker f.

 Baphia wollastonii Baker f.

Series Spathaceae M.O.Soladoye

 Baphia eriocalyx Harms
 Baphia spathacea Hook.f.
 subsp. polyantha (Harms) M.O.Soladoye
 subsp. spathacea Hook.f.

Section Bracteolaria (Hochst.) Benth.

 Baphia aurivellera Taubert

 Baphia capparidifolia Baker
 subsp. bangweolensis (R.E.Fries) Brummitt
 subsp. capparidifolia Baker
 subsp. multiflora (Harms) Brummitt
 subsp. polygalacea Brummitt
 Baphia dubia De Wild.

 Baphia heudelotiana Baillon
 Baphia kirkii Baker
 subsp. kirkii Baker
 subsp. ovata (Sim) M.O.Soladoye
 Baphia laurentii De Wild.

 Baphia racemosa (Hochst.) Baker

Section Longibracteolatae (Lester-Garland) M.O.Soladoye

Series Chrysophyllae M.O.Soladoye
 Baphia burttii Baker f.

 Baphia chrysophylla Taubert
 subsp. chrysophylla Taubert
 subsp. claessensii (De Wild.) Brummitt

 Baphia cuspidata Taubert

 Baphia massaiensis Taubert
 subsp. busseana (Harms) M.O.Soladoye
 subsp. floribunda Brummitt
 subsp. gomesii (Baker f.) Brummitt
 subsp. massaiensis Taubert
 subsp. obovata (Schinz) Brummitt
 var. cornifolia (Harms) M.O.Soladoye
 var. obovata (Schinz) M.O.Soladoye
 var. whitei (Brummitt) M.O.Soladoye

 Baphia speciosa J.B.Gillett & Brummitt

Series Macranthae M.O.Soladoye
 Baphia bequaertii De Wild.

 Baphia letestui Pellegrin

 Baphia maxima Baker

Series Striatae (Lester Garland) M.O.Soladoye

 Baphia leptobotrys Harms
 subsp. leptobotrys Harms
 subsp. silvatica (Harms) M.O.Soladoye
 Baphia pilosa Baillon
 subsp. batangensis (Harms) M.O.Soladoye
 subsp. pilosa Baillon

Section Macrobaphia Harms emend. M.O.Soladoye
 Baphia bergeri De Wild.
 Baphia macrocalyx Harms

 Baphia semseiana Brummitt

Incertae sedis
 Baphia cymosa Breteler
 Baphia madagascariensis (A.Heller) A.Heller

Species names with uncertain taxonomic status
The status of the following species is unresolved:
 Baphia glauca A. Chev.
 Baphia longepetiolata Taub.
 Baphia madagascariensis C.H. Stirt. & Du Puy
 Baphia megaphylla Breteler
 Baphia radcliffei Baker f.

References

 
Fabaceae genera
Taxonomy articles created by Polbot